The Philippine Basketball Association Finals Most Valuable Player award is an award given to the player who makes an outstanding performance during a conference finals. Usually, the award is given to a player who is a member of the champion team in a conference and is given always at the end of the finals series.

Listed here are the PBA Finals MVP Awardees starting from 1996 up to the present.

Winners

Multiple-time winners

Finals Most Valuable Player
Basketball most valuable player awards
Awards established in 1996
1996 establishments in the Philippines